Major General Per Åke Nilsson Kellin (17 September 1903 – 31 March 1973) was a Swedish Army officer. He served as Chief of Home Guard from 1955 to 1968

Early life
Kellin was born on 17 September 1903 in Svea Life Guards Parish (Svea Livgardes församling) in Stockholm, Sweden, the son of captain Nils Adolf Kellin and his wife Thyra Charlotta Hermansson.

Career
Kellin was commissioned as an officer in 1924 with the rank of second lieutenant and was assigned to Södermanland Regiment (I 10) the same year. Kellin was promoted to lieutenant in 1928 and to captain in the General Staff Corps. In 1939, Kellin participated in a course in the French Army.  He served as a teacher at the Royal Swedish Naval Staff College from 1940 to 1942 when he was promoted to major. During this time, Kellin was also military contributor in Radiotjänst (1941–1945), Arbetet (1941–1944) and in Svenska Dagbladet (1941–1947).

Kellin served as Vice Chief of the Military Office of the Land Defence (Lantförsvarets kommandoexpedition) in 1944 and as Chief of the Army Section in the Military Office of the Minister of Defence from 1945 to 1947. He was promoted to lieutenant colonel in the General Staff Corps in 1946 and he served in the Älvsborg Regiment (I 15) in 1947. Kellin was promoted to colonel in the General Staff Corps in 1950 and he was appointed Section Chief in the Army Staff. In 1952, Kellin was promoted to colonel in the Swedish Army Service Troops and in 1952 he was appointed commanding officer of the Scanian Logistic Regiment in Hässleholm.

On 1 October 1955, Kellin assumed the position of Chief of Home Guard and became a member of the Executive Committee of the Central Board of the National [Swedish] Rifle Clubs (Skytteförbundens överstyrelse). He was promoted to major general in 1959. He held the Chief of Home Guard position until 30 September 1968 when he retired from active service.

Personal life
Kellin married on 7 October 1930 in Frustuna, Södermanland County to Selma Birgitta (Britta) Jernbergh (born 8 August 1906 in Eskilstuna), the daughter of kronokassören JK Carl Laurentius (Lars) Jernbergh and Selma Christina Lovisa Henschen.

Dates of rank
31 December 1924 – Second lieutenant
30 December 1926 – Underlöjtnant
1 January 1928 – Lieutenant
1 October 1937 – Captain
1 October 1942 – Major
1 October 1946 – Lieutenant colonel
1 October 1950 – Colonel
1 October 1959 – Major general

Awards and decorations
Kellin's awards:

Swedish
   Commander 1st Class of the Order of the Sword (23 November 1956)
   Knight of the Order of the Polar Star
   Knight of the Order of Vasa
   Home Guard Silver Medal
   Swedish Central Federation for Voluntary Military Training Medal of Merit in silver
  Swedish Red Cross Gold Medal (Svenska Röda Korsets Guldmedalj)
  National Federation of Swedish Women's Auxiliary Defence Services' Silver Medal (Riksförbundet Sveriges lottakårers silvermedalj)
  National Swedish Rifle Association's silver medal (Sveriges skytteförbunds överstyrelses silvermedalj)
  North Scanian Association for Volunteer Military Training's Silver Medal (Norra skånska befäls(utbildnings)förbundets silvermedalj)
  Swedish Army and Air Force Reserve Officers Association's Badge of Honor (Svenska arméns och flygvapnets reservofficersförbunds hederstecken)

Foreign
   Commander with Star of the Order of St. Olav (1 July 1968)
   Commander of the Order of the Lion of Finland
   Officer of the Order of the Crown of Italy
   Knight of the Legion of Honour
   King Christian X's Liberty Medal
  Danish Reserve Officers Association's Badge of Honor (Danska reservofficersförbundets hederstecken)
  Danish Home Guard Badge of Merit

Honours
Member of the Royal Swedish Academy of War Sciences (1946)

References

External links
Article at Svenskt biografiskt lexikon 

1903 births
1973 deaths
Swedish Army major generals
Military personnel from Stockholm
Members of the Royal Swedish Academy of War Sciences
Commanders First Class of the Order of the Sword
Knights of the Order of the Polar Star
Knights of the Order of Vasa